Fovou tous Ellines (also known as Beware of Greeks Bearing Guns) is a film directed by John Tatoulis. Filmed in Australia and the island of Crete, Greece it is a romantic comedy / drama that stars Lakis Lazopoulos alongside Zoe Carides, Claudia Buttazzoni and John Bluthal.

Cast
Lakis Lazopoulos as Manos and George
Zoe Carides as Niki
John Bluthal as Stephanos
Claudia Buttazzoni as Katerina
Damien Fotiou as Jim
Tasso Kavadia as Maria
Osvaldo Maione as  Enzo
Percy Sieff as Petros
Ron Haddrick as Thomas
Anastasia Malinof as Helen
Noni Ioannidou as young Maria (1943–1971)
Dimitris Kaperonis as young Manos (1971)
 Alexandros Kaperonis as young George (1971)
 Artemis Ionnides as young Nicki (1971)
 Nikos Psarras as young Vasilli (1943)
 Dimitris Kalantzis as young Stephanos (1943)

Release
The film was highly popular in Greece.

References

External links 
 
Beware of Greeks Bearing Guns at Urban Cinefile
Beware of Greeks Bearing Guns at Oz Movies

2000 films
Greek romantic comedy films
Australian romantic comedy films
2000 romantic comedy films
Films directed by John Tatoulis
English-language Greek films
2000s Greek-language films
2000s English-language films
2000 multilingual films
Australian multilingual films
Greek multilingual films